Burkhard Balz (born 24 July 1969) is a German politician of the Christian Democratic Union of Germany, part of the European People's Party. From 2009 until 2018, he served as Member of the European Parliament (MEP) from Germany.

Early career
Between 2000 and 2009, Balz held various positions at Commerzbank in Hannover, Frankfurt am Main, Tokyo, London and Brussels.

Political career

Member of the European Parliament, 2009–2018
In the European Parliament, Balz was a member of the Committee on Economic and Monetary Affairs (ECON), the Special Committee on the Financial, Economic and Social Crisis (CRIS) and the Parliament's delegation for relations with the countries of Southeast Asia and the Association of Southeast Asian Nations (ASEAN). In 2013, he served as the Parliament's rapporteur on Latvia’s accession to the eurozone. He joined the Special Committee on Tax Rulings and Other Measures Similar in Nature or Effect in 2015 and the Committee of Inquiry into Money Laundering, Tax Avoidance and Tax Evasion in 2016.

In addition, Balz was substitute for the Committee on Transport and Tourism (TRAN) and the parliament's delegation for relations with the People's Republic of China.

Member of the Board of the Bundesbank, 2018–present
In early 2018, Balz was nominated to join the board of Germany's central bank, replacing Andreas Dombret.

Other activities

Corporate boards
 Apaton Capital AG, Member of the Supervisory Board (since 2007)
 ARAG Group, Member of the Advisory Board (since 2014)
 Bausparkasse Schwäbisch Hall, Ombudsman (since 2012)
 MVI PROPLANT Nord GmbH, Member of the Advisory Board (since 2014)
 Sparda-Banken, Member of the Advisory Board (since 2012)

Non-profit organizations
 Baden-Badener Unternehmer-Gespräche (BBUG), Member of the Board of Trustees
 Kangaroo Group, Member

References

External links 
 Homepage of Burkhard Balz (German)
 Burkhard Balz at the European Parliament

1969 births
Living people
Christian Democratic Union of Germany MEPs
People from Lemgo
MEPs for Germany 2009–2014
MEPs for Germany 2014–2019
Politicians from North Rhine-Westphalia